The Michael Marks Awards for Poetry Pamphlets are annual awards for pamphlets published in the UK. The awards aim to promote the pamphlet form and to enable poets and publishers to develop and continue creating. Since their inception, they have grown to include three annual awards, for "Poetry Pamphlet", "Publisher" and "Illustration", carrying prizes of up to £5,000, and awarding places on "The Michael Marks Poets in Residence Program" in Greece. Additional awards have included the "Poetry Pamphlet in a Celtic Language" and, as of 2022, the Environmental Poet of the Year prize.

The awards were founded in 2009 by the Michael Marks Charitable Trust, in a collaboration with the British Library that continues to this day. They are funded entirely by the Michael Marks Charitable Trust, and are enabled through partnerships between the British Library, the Wordsworth Trust, The TLS and the Harvard Center for Hellenic Studies, and in association with the National Library of Wales and the National Library of Scotland. As of 2012, the awards have been administered by Wordsworth Trust. The Michael Marks Charitable Trust was established in 1966 by the late Lord Marks, 2nd Baron of Broughton. Both awards carry a prize of £5,000.

The Nobel laureate Seamus Heaney praised the prize's establishment:

Winners and nominees
The award recognises an outstanding work of poetry published in pamphlet form – defined by the Awards as containing no more than 36 pages – in the UK.

The following is a list of shortlisted pamphlets. Winners are listed in yellow, first in their year.

 2016 shortlist announcement. Winner announcement. Wound, by Richard Scott.
 2017 shortlist announcement. Winner announcement. I Refuse to Turn into a Hatstand, by Charlotte Wetton.

Michael Marks Publishers' Award
The Michael Marks Publishers' Award recognises an outstanding UK publisher of poetry in pamphlet form.

The following is a list of shortlisted publishers. Winners are listed in yellow, first in their year.

Award for Poetry in a Celtic Language

In 2019, the inaugural Michael Marks Award for Poetry in a Celtic Language was awarded to Morgan Owen for his pamphlet moroedd/dŵr, published by Cyhoeddiadau'r Stamp.

References

External links
Michael Marks Awards, official website of the Awards
Michael Marks Awards, official website at British Library

British Library
British poetry awards
2009 establishments in the United Kingdom
Awards established in 2009
Publisher awards